Elections were held in the state of Western Australia on 15 February 1936 to elect all 50 members to the Legislative Assembly. The Labor Party, led by Premier Philip Collier, won a second term in office against the Country and Nationalist parties, led by Opposition Leader Charles Latham and Norbert Keenan respectively.

The only member to retire at the election was Labor member for Kalgoorlie James Cunningham, who transferred to the Australian Senate the following year.

Results

At the election, 5 sitting members (four Labor and one Nationalist) were defeated—three of them by independents. In Maylands, one-term MLA Robert Clothier (Labor) was defeated by independent Nationalist Harry Shearn, who won with preferences from two endorsed nationalists. In East Perth, Minister for Employment and Labour James Kenneally was defeated by former Labor member Thomas Hughes, and the Nationalist member for Nelson, John Henry Smith, was defeated by independent Clarence Doust. The remaining seats, Subiaco and Albany, were lost by Labor to the Nationalist and Country parties respectively.

|}

 247,465 electors were enrolled to vote at the election, but 15 of the 50 seats were uncontested—10 Labor seats representing 33,038 enrolled voters, 1 Nationalist seat representing 3,933 voters and 4 Country seats representing 16,284 voters.

See also
 Members of the Western Australian Legislative Assembly, 1933–1936
 Members of the Western Australian Legislative Assembly, 1936–1939
 Second Collier Ministry

References

Elections in Western Australia
1936 elections in Australia
1930s in Western Australia
February 1936 events